Jerry Mason (born 1942, Pittsburgh, Pennsylvania) is an American former singer, songwriter, guitar player, and entertainer during America's rock and roll era.   Mason currently lives in Southern California. Mason is of Romani (Gypsy) heritage.

Mason replaced one of the original members of The Four Lads, singer Bernie Torish, for a while.

Recordings
"The Four Winds and the Seven Seas", Kapp Records, New York, NY, 1959 
 "Strange Feelings", Kapp Records, New York, NY, 1959
"You Are Lonely", Chess Records, Chicago, IL, 1960 
"You’re Cruel", Chess Records, Chicago, IL, 1960
"Jones Street", Swan Records, Philadelphia, PA, 1962 
"Sweet Enough For You", Swan Records, Philadelphia, PA, 1962

Television shows Mason appeared on
The Big Beat, New York, NY, 1959, producer and host Alan Freed
Shindig, Hollywood, CA, 1965, producer Jack Good, host Jimmy O'Neil 
 Hollywood A Go-Go, Hollywood, CA, 1965, producer Al Burton, host Sam Riddle 
Joey Bishop and Regis Philbin Telethon, Philadelphia, PA, 1970

References

External links

 Official home page

1942 births
Living people
Songwriters from Pennsylvania
Musicians from Pittsburgh
Chess Records artists
American people of Romani descent
American Romani people
Romani musicians
Romani singers
People from California